Héctor Fabián Ramírez (born June 26, 1982 in Cali, Colombia) is a Colombian footballer currently playing for Halcones in Guatemala.

Teams
  Cortuluá 2004
  Monagas SC 2004
  Delfín 2005
  Deportivo Quevedo 2006
  Deportivo Armenio 2006-2007
  Cortuluá 2007-2008
  Inti Gas Deportes 2009
  Sport Huancayo 2010
  Cortuluá 2011–2012
  Halcones 2012–present

External links
 Profile at BDFA
 Profile at Ceroacero

1982 births
Living people
Colombian footballers
Cortuluá footballers
Monagas S.C. players
Delfín S.C. footballers
C.D. Quevedo footballers
Deportivo Armenio footballers
Ayacucho FC footballers
Sport Huancayo footballers
Colombian expatriate footballers
Expatriate footballers in Argentina
Expatriate footballers in Ecuador
Expatriate footballers in Peru
Expatriate footballers in Venezuela
Association football forwards
Footballers from Cali